Ralph Hawkins may refer to:

 Ralph Hawkins (American football) (1934–2004), former American football coach
 Ralph Hawkins (bishop) (1911–1987), Anglican Bishop of Bunbury, 1957–1977